Winchell is a surname. It may refer to:

People
Alexander Winchell (1824-1891), American geologist
Alexander Newton Winchell (1874-1958), American geologist
April Winchell, actress, writer, host and commentator
Barry Winchell, infantryman in the U.S. Army linked to the "don't ask, don't tell" policy
Constance Winchell, reference librarian
Danny Winchell, entertainer
Horace Vaughn Winchell (1865–1923), American geologist
Lynn Winchell, former Playboy playmate of the month
Mark Royden Winchell (1948-2008), biographer, essayist, historian and literary critic
Newton Horace Winchell (1839–1914), American geologist
Paul Winchell, ventriloquist, inventor of the artificial heart
Steve Winchell, character in The OA
Verne Winchell, founder of Winchell's Donuts
Walter Winchell, journalist

Other
Winchell (film)
Winchell, Texas
Winchell's Donuts, a donut company
Mount Winchell, California
Winchell Lake, a lake in Minnesota
Winchell Trail, a hiking path in Minneapolis